Hedenstroemia is an extinct genus of Early Triassic (Olenekian) cephalopods in the ammonoid order Ceratitida. They were nektonic carnivores.

Species

Distribution
Fossils of species within this family have been found in the Early Triassic of Afghanistan, Canada, Oman, Pakistan, Russia and United States.

References

 J. Perrin Smith  U.S. Lower Triassic Ammonoid of North America pg. 77 Geological Survey Professional Paper

Hedenstroemiidae
Ceratitida genera
Triassic ammonites
Ammonites of North America